Rya Taza or Ria Taza is a village in the Alagyaz Municipality of the Aragatsotn Province of Armenia. It was formerly known as Kondakhsaz or known by locals as Qundesaz. Most residents of Rya Taza are Yezidis who belong to the Sîpka/Sîpkî who've migrated into the Aparan region since the 1800s.

The village is home to a ruined Armenian church built between the 10th and 13th centuries. It also contains an old cemetery with Grabmal%20auf%20dem%20Friedhof%20von%20Rya%20Taza,%20Armenien%20II%5D%5D animal-shaped tombstones. In December 2020, a Yezidi cleric from the Lalish holy site located in Iraq blessed a newly built temple named after Shekhubekir (Şêxûbekir) which is intended to be opened to the public in 2021.

References

Kiesling, Rediscovering Armenia, p. 22, available online at the US embassy to Armenia's website

Populated places in Aragatsotn Province
Yazidi villages
Yazidi populated places in Armenia